The 1921 Invercargill mayoral election was held on 27 April 1921 as part of that year's local elections.

Incumbent mayor John Stead was defeated by councillor John Lillicrap.

Results
The following table gives the election results:

References

1921 elections in New Zealand
Mayoral elections in Invercargill